The 2000 Davis Cup (also known as the 2000 Davis Cup by NEC for sponsorship purposes) was the 89th edition of the Davis Cup, the most important tournament between national teams in men's tennis. 135 teams entered the competition, 16 in the World Group, 30 in the Americas Zone, 31 in the Asia/Oceania Zone, and 58 in the Europe/Africa Zone. Andorra, Lesotho, Mauritius and Namibia made their first appearances in the tournament.

Spain defeated Australia in the final, held at the Palau Sant Jordi in Barcelona, Spain, on 8–10 December, to win their first title.

World Group

Draw

Final
Spain vs. Australia

World Group Qualifying Round

Date: 14–23 July

The eight losing teams in the World Group first round ties and eight winners of the Zonal Group I final round ties competed in the World Group Qualifying Round for spots in the 2001 World Group.

Americas Zone

Group I

Group II

Group III
 Venue: Liguanea Club, Kingston, Jamaica
 Date: 22–26 March

Final standings

  and  promoted to Group II in 2001.
  and  relegated to Group IV in 2001.

Group IV
 Venue: Club Hondureno Arabe, San Pedro Sula, Honduras
 Date: 13–19 March

Final standings

  and  promoted to Group III in 2001.

Asia/Oceania Zone

Group I

Group II

Group III
 Venue: National Tennis Centre, Colombo, Sri Lanka
 Date: 9–13 February

Final standings

  and  promoted to Group II in 2001.
  and  relegated to Group IV in 2001.

Group IV
 Venue: Al Hussein Sports City, Amman, Jordan
 Date: 24–30 April

Final standings

  and  promoted to Group III in 2001.

Europe/Africa Zone

Group I

Group II

Group III

Zone A
 Venue: Tennis Club de Tunis, Tunis, Tunisia
 Date: 24–28 May

Final standings

  and  promoted to Group II in 2001.
  and  relegated to Group IV in 2001.

Zone B
 Venue: Association Culturelle et Sportive d'Ambohidahy, Antananarivo, Madagascar
 Date: 24–28 May

Final standings

  and  promoted to Group II in 2001.
  and  relegated to Group IV in 2001.

Group IV

Zone A
 Venue: Lugogo Tennis Club, Kampala, Uganda
 Date: 19–23 January

Group A

Group B

  and  promoted to Group III in 2001.

Zone B
 Venue: Accra Sports Stadium, Accra, Ghana
 Date: 14–20 February

Final standings

  and  promoted to Group III in 2001.

References
General

Specific

External links
Davis Cup official website

 
Davis Cups by year
Davis Cup
Davis Cup